Pingtai is a town of Yunan County in western Guangdong province, China, just  east of the border with Guangxi and south of G80 Guangzhou–Kunming Expressway. , it has one residential community and 13 villages under its administration.

See also 
 List of township-level divisions of Guangdong

References 

Township-level divisions of Guangdong
Yunfu